Zobida trinitas is a moth of the subfamily Arctiinae first described by Embrik Strand in 1912. It is found in Cameroon, Ghana, Kenya, Nigeria, Togo and Morocco.

References

Moths described in 1912
Lithosiina
Moths of Africa